The 2011 New York Jets season was the franchise's 42nd season in the National Football League (NFL), the 52nd season overall and the team's third season under head coach Rex Ryan. They failed to improve upon their 11–5 record from 2010 and failed to reach the playoffs for the first time since 2008. This season would begin a lengthy postseason drought for the Jets. Since 2011, the team has failed to qualify for the playoffs.

Transactions

Coaching changes
Strength and conditioning coach Sal Alosi tendered his resignation from the team on January 31, 2011. In November 2010, Alosi became embroiled in controversy when he tripped Miami Dolphins' cornerback Nolan Carroll on a punt return that resulted in his suspension from the team. Former Atlanta Falcons' assistant Bill Hughan was hired as the team's new strength and conditioning coach two weeks later on February 14, 2011.
Mike Bloomgren left his assistant offensive coordinator position with the team in February to become the offensive line coach and run coordinator at Stanford.
Former Indianapolis Colts offensive coordinator Tom Moore was hired as an offensive consultant for the team in July 2011.

Arrivals

The Jets signed Nick Novak on February 9, 2011 to compete with incumbent kicker Nick Folk.
The Jets announced the addition of ten undrafted free agents on July 27, 2011; Josh Baker, Collin Franklin, Nick Bellore, Stafford Gatling, Michael Campbell, Dan DePalma, Courtney Smith, Tom Ottaiano, Chris Stewart, and Julian Posey.
The Jets announced the addition of six undrafted free agents on July 28, 2011; Byron Landor, Davon Morgan, Zane Taylor, Taylor Boggs, Jeff Wills, and Matthias Berning.
The Jets signed Chris Bryan and undrafted free agents Jeremy McGee and Jake Duron on July 29, 2011.
The Jets signed Donald Strickland on July 30, 2011.
The Jets signed Plaxico Burress on July 31, 2011.
The Jets signed DaJuan Morgan on August 2, 2011.
The Jets signed Trevor Canfield and Pete Clifford on August 4, 2011.
The Jets signed Derrick Mason on August 6, 2011.
The Jets signed Wilson Raynor and Keith Zinger on August 7, 2011.
The Jets signed David Herron and Eddie Jones on August 9, 2011.
The Jets signed Cordarol Scales on August 10, 2011.
The Jets signed Aaron Maybin on August 17, 2011.
The Jets signed Tracy Wilson and Nevin McCaskill on August 24, 2011.
The Jets signed Isaiah Trufant on September 1, 2011.
The Jets claimed Andrew Sendejo, Mardy Gilyard, Kevin O'Connell, and Colin Baxter off waivers on September 4, 2011.
The Jets promoted Isaiah Trufant from the practice squad on September 10, 2011.
The Jets promoted Patrick Turner from the practice squad on September 13, 2011.
The Jets promoted Josh Baker from the practice squad on September 27, 2011.
The Jets re-signed Aaron Maybin on September 28, 2011.
The Jets promoted Eddie Jones from the practice squad on October 8, 2011.
The Jets re-signed Ellis Lankster on October 11, 2011. Additionally, Martin Tevaseu was promoted from the practice squad.
The Jets signed Eron Riley off the Broncos' practice squad on October 19, 2011.
Shawn Nelson was signed to the Jets from Free Agency on October 31, 2011.
The Jets signed Austin Howard from the Ravens' practice squad on November 25, 2011.
The Jets promoted Tracy Wilson from the practice squad on November 28, 2011.
The Jets signed Gerald Alexander following a season-ending knee injury to Jim Leonhard on December 13, 2011.
The Jets promoted Ricky Sapp from the practice squad on December 29, 2011.

Departures
The Jets released veterans Damien Woody, Kris Jenkins and Jason Taylor on February 28, 2011.
The Jets released Vernon Gholston and Ben Hartsock on March 2, 2011.
The Jets released Mark Brunell, Kevin O'Connell, Will Billingsley and Marlon Davis on July 29, 2011. Additionally, the Jets officially released retired quarterback Erik Ainge.
The Jets released Carlos Brown on August 2, 2011.
The Jets released Jerricho Cotchery on August 4, 2011. Additionally, Tom Ottaiano, Jeff Wills and Jeremy McGee were waived.
The Jets released Cody Brown and waived Collin Franklin on August 7, 2011.
The Jets waived DaJuan Morgan, Satfford Gatling and Carlton Powell.
The Jets waived Taylor Boggs and David Herron on August 12, 2011.
The Jets waived Cordarol Scales and Richard Taylor on August 17, 2011.
The Jets waived Wilson Raynor, Brian Toal and Jake Duron on August 23, 2011.
The Jets waived Brandon Long and Chris Stewart on August 24, 2011.
The Jets waived Chris Bryan, Nick Novak and Courtney Smith on August 30, 2011.
To meet the mandatory 53 man roster requirement, the Jets waived Josh Baker, Matthias Berning, Michael Campbell, Trevor Canfield, Pete Clifford, Dan DePalma, Robby Felix, Jarron Gilbert, Chris Jennings, Eddie Jones, Matt Kroul, Dennis Landolt, Byron Landor, Ellis Lankster, Joey LaRocque, Nevin McCaskill, Scotty McKnight, Davon Morgan, Julian Posey, Brashton Satele, Zane Taylor, Patrick Turner, Lorenzo Washington, Drew Willy, Tracy Wilson and Keith Zinger.
The Jets waived Aaron Maybin, Isaiah Trufant and Martin Tevaseu on September 4, 2011.
The Jets cut Mardy Gilyard on September 9, 2011.
The Jets waived Andrew Sendejo on September 13, 2011.
The Jets released Eddie Jones on October 11, 2011.
The Jets waived Martin Tevaseu on October 18, 2011.
The Jets waived Colin Baxter on October 25, 2011.
The Jets waived Shawn Nelson on November 22, 2011.
The Jets waived Emanuel Cook on November 28, 2011.
The Jets waived Eron Riley on December 28, 2011.

Practice squad

Additions
The Jets signed Josh Baker, Matthias Berning, Trevor Canfield, Jarron Gilbert, Matt Kroul, Julian Posey and Patrick Turner to the practice squad on September 4, 2011.
The Jets signed Martin Tevaseu and Isaiah Trufant on September 5, 2011.
The Jets signed Josh Baker and Andrew Sendejo on September 14, 2011.
The Jets signed Matthias Berning and Scotty McKnight on September 21, 2011.
The Jets signed Martell Webb, Michael Campbell and Julian Posey on September 27, 2011.
The Jets signed Eddie Jones on September 28, 2011.
The Jets signed Dennis Landolt on October 4, 2011.
The Jets signed Michael Campbell and Tracy Wilson on October 12, 2011.
The Jets re-signed Martin Tevaseu on October 20, 2011.
The Jets signed Ricky Sapp and Jamarko Simmons and re-signed Matt Kroul and Dennis Landolt on October 31, 2011.
The Jets re-signed Michael Campbell on November 1, 2011.
The Jets signed Dexter Jackson on November 9, 2011.
The Jets re-signed Jarron Gilbert on November 19, 2011.
The Jets re-signed Eddie Jones on November 21, 2011.
The Jets re-signed Ricky Sapp on November 28, 2011.
The Jets re-signed Dexter Jackson on November 30, 2011.
The Jets signed Mark LeGree on December 13, 2011.
The Jets signed Eron Riley on December 29, 2011.

Departures
The Jets released Josh Baker on September 5, 2011.
The Jets promoted Isaiah Trufant to the active roster on September 10, 2011.
The Jets released Matthias Berning on September 13, 2011.
The Jets promoted Patrick Turner to the active roster on September 14, 2011.
The Jets released Trevor Canfield and Julian Posey on September 19, 2011.
Andrew Sendejo and Matthias Berning were released on September 27, 2011. Additionally, Josh Baker was promoted to the active roster.
The Jets released Martell Webb and Michael Campbell on October 4, 2011.
The Jets promoted Eddie Jones to the active roster on October 8, 2011.
The Jets promoted Martin Tevaseu to the active roster on October 12, 2011.
The Jets released Dennis Landolt on October 18, 2011.
The Jets promoted Martin Tevaseu to the active roster on October 22, 2011.
The Jets released Michael Campbell on October 24, 2011.
The Jets released Matt Kroul on October 25, 2011.
The Jets released Eddie Jones on October 31, 2011.
The Jets released Jarron Gilbert on November 9, 2011.
The Jets released Dexter Jackson on November 19, 2011.
The Jets released Ricky Sapp on November 21, 2011.
The Jets released Eddie Jones and promoted Tracy Wilson to the active roster on November 28, 2011.
The Jets promoted Ricky Sapp to the active roster on December 29, 2011.

Trades

To Jets
The Jets traded an unconditional draft pick to the Green Bay Packers for Caleb Schlauderaff.

From Jets
Dwight Lowery was traded to the Jacksonville Jaguars for an unconditional draft pick.
Derrick Mason was traded to the Houston Texans for an unconditional draft pick on October 11, 2011.

Free Agents

2011 NFL Draft

Preseason

Regular season

Schedule

Note: Intra-division opponents are in bold text.

 Colored throwback Titans jerseys

Standings

Division

Conference

Staff

Final roster

Regular season results

Week 1: vs. Dallas Cowboys

The Jets trailed 24-10 heading into the 4th quarter. In the 4th quarter, the Jets scored 17 unanswered points preserving the win for them. With the win, the Jets started their season 1–0.

Week 2: vs. Jacksonville Jaguars

With the huge win, the Jets improved to 2–0.

Week 3: at Oakland Raiders

With the loss, the Jets fell to 2–1.

Week 4: at Baltimore Ravens

Hoping to rebound from their Week 3 road loss to the Raiders, the Jets flew to M&T Bank Stadium for a Week 4 Sunday night battle with the Baltimore Ravens, also head coach Rex Ryan's first return to Baltimore since leaving the Ravens following the 2008 season. Ryan served as the Ravens' defensive line coach, defensive coordinator, and assistant head coach from the 1999 to 2008 seasons, and was part of their 2000 Super Bowl-winning squad. New York trailed early in the first quarter with Ravens linebacker Jameel McClain returning a fumble 6 yards for a touchdown. The Jets would respond with running back Joe McKnight returning a kickoff 107 yards for a touchdown. Baltimore would regain the lead with kicker Billy Cundiff getting a 38-yard field goal, followed by running back Ray Rice getting a 3-yard touchdown run. The Ravens added onto their lead in the second quarter with Cundiff making another 38-yard field goal, followed by linebacker Jarret Johnson returning a fumble 26 yards for a touchdown. New York responded with linebacker David Harris returning an interception 36 yards for a touchdown, followed by a 40-yard field goal from kicker Nick Folk. Baltimore came right back in the third quarter with cornerback Lardarius Webb returning an interception 73 yards for a touchdown. From there, the Ravens' defense prevented any comeback attempt.

With the loss, the Jets fell to 2–2.

Week 5: at New England Patriots

With the loss, the Jets fell to 2–3.

Week 6: vs. Miami Dolphins

With the win, the Jets improved to 3–3.

Week 7: vs San Diego Chargers

With the win, the Jets went into their bye week at 4–3.

Week 9: at Buffalo Bills

With the win, the Jets improved to 5–3.

Week 10: vs. New England Patriots

The Patriots head to MetLife Stadium for a Week 10 Sunday Night game with the Jets. The only time the Jets would lead would be in the 2nd quarter when they led 9-7 but they would get blown out in front of their home crowd 37-16. With the loss, the Jets dropped to 5-4. New York was also swept by New England for the first time since New England's 2007 season.

Week 11: at Denver Broncos

The second primetime game in a row for the Jets yet it was a Thursday Night game. The Jets led 13-10 with a little over a minute remaining when Broncos quarterback Tim Tebow marched his team down the field and scored the game-winning touchdown. With the loss, the Jets fell to 5-5 and needing to win some more games to qualify for the playoffs.

Week 12: vs. Buffalo Bills

The Jets would come out on top in a seesaw battle over the Buffalo Bills. This time the Jets scored a game-winning touchdown. With the win, the Jets improved to 6-5 continuing on the road to a playoff berth.

Week 13: at Washington Redskins

The Jets would not lead for much of the game until the very end of the 4th quarter when they blew the game wide open. With the win, the Jets improved to 7-5.

Week 14: vs. Kansas City Chiefs

The Jets won easily in a crushing rout, with the final score overstating the closeness of the game as the Chiefs' only touchdown came in garbage time after the game was already decided.  The Chiefs offense gained only 4 total yards in the first two quarters.  The Chiefs were also plagued with penalties, finishing the game with 11 penalties total.  The Jets' final touchdown drive in the third quarter proved to be a particularly humiliating stretch.  Starting from their own 10-yard line, the Jets gained 81 penalty yards on 5 penalties committed by the Chiefs, including a rare penalty directly assessed against head coach Todd Haley for unsportsmanlike conduct.  The Jets improved to 8–5 and could "control their playoff destiny" at this point in the season, guaranteed to make it to the playoffs by winning the rest of their games.

Week 15: at Philadelphia Eagles

The Jets would be thoroughly dominated by the Eagles throughout the game. With the loss, the Jets fell to 8–6. The Jets have never beaten the Eagles in franchise history.

Week 16: vs. New York Giants

Both the Jets and Giants needed a win in order to stay in the playoff race. The Jets (8–6) hosting the Giants (7–7) would battle each other on Christmas Eve, Saturday afternoon edition. The Jets would lead 7–0 early on but the Giants responded and took over the rest of the game. With the loss for the Jets, they fell to 8–7.

Week 17: at Miami Dolphins

References

New York Jets
New York Jets seasons
New York Jets season
21st century in East Rutherford, New Jersey
Meadowlands Sports Complex